Juanito is a given name or nickname, meaning "Little Juan" or Johnny. Notable people with the name include:

Professional footballers
 Juan Ignacio Gomez Taleb (born 1985), Argentinian forward
 Juan Díaz Sánchez (1948–2013), Spanish forward
 Juan Gómez González (1954–1992), Spanish forward
 Juan Francisco Rodríguez Herrera (born 1965), Spanish defender and manager
 Juan Gutiérrez Moreno (born 1976), Spanish defender and manager
 Juan Jesús Gutiérrez Robles (born 1980), Spanish defender/midfielder
 Juan Calahorro (born 1988), Spanish defender
 Juanito Sequeira (born 1982), Dutch midfielder
Other professions
 Juanito (singer) (born 1936), French-Algerian singer born Jean Claude Safrana, popular in Turkey during the 1960s
 Juanito Ibarra, Mexican-American boxing and mixed martial arts trainer
 Juanito Navarro (1924–2011), Spanish actor
 Juanito Oiarzabal (born 1956), Spanish mountaineer
 Juanito Victor C. Remulla, Filipino politician known as Jonvic Remulla
 Juanito Rubillar (born 1977), Filipino boxer

See also
 San Juanito (disambiguation), various meanings